El Tornadizo is a village and municipality in the province of Salamanca,  western Spain, part of the autonomous community of Castile-Leon.

Geography
The postal code is 37765.

Economy
The basis of the economy is agriculture.

See also
List of municipalities in Salamanca

References

Municipalities in the Province of Salamanca